Family Style  is the only studio album featuring guitarists and vocalists Jimmie and Stevie Ray Vaughan.  It was released on September 25, 1990. In his early years, Stevie often remarked that he would like to do an album with his elder brother. That wish turned out to be his last studio performance, released nearly a month after his death. The liner notes end with "Thanks Mama V. for letting us play."

The album received mixed reviews. Critics praised the songwriting of both brothers, and highlighted songs such as "D/FW", "Tick Tock", and "Telephone Song", while some criticized the lack of their own personal styles, and the songs straying too far from traditional blues. The album peaked at number seven on the Billboard 200 Albums chart.

Track listing
 "Hard to Be" (Stevie Ray Vaughan, Doyle Bramhall) – 4:43
 "White Boots" (Billy Swan, Jim Leslie, Deborah Hutchenson) – 3:50
 "D/FW" (Jimmie Vaughan) – 2:52
 "Good Texan" (J. Vaughan, Nile Rodgers) – 4:22
 "Hillbillies from Outerspace" (J. Vaughan, S. R. Vaughan) – 3:42
 "Long Way from Home" (S. R. Vaughan, D. Bramhall) – 3:15
 "Tick Tock" (J. Vaughan, Rodgers, Jerry Lynn Williams) – 4:57
 "Telephone Song" (S. R. Vaughan, Bramhall) – 3:28
 "Baboom/Mama Said" (J. Vaughan, S. R. Vaughan, Denny Freeman) – 4:29
 "Brothers" (J. Vaughan, S. R. Vaughan) – 5:05

Personnel
 Jimmie Vaughan – guitar, lap steel guitar, vocals, organ
 Stevie Ray Vaughan – guitar, vocals
 Al Berry – bass
 Larry Aberman – drums
 Doyle Bramhall – drums
 Nile Rodgers – guitar, producer
 Richard Hilton – organ
 Tawatha Agee – vocals
 Frank Simms – vocals
 George Simms – vocals
 Brenda White-King – vocals
 Curtis King Jr. – vocals
 Preston Hubbard – upright bass
 Stan Harrison – tenor saxophone

Charts

References

Stevie Ray Vaughan albums
1990 albums
Albums produced by Nile Rodgers
Epic Records albums
Grammy Award for Best Contemporary Blues Album
Albums published posthumously